Kalaki may refer to:
Kalki, a Hindu god
a district in eastern Uganda
Kələki, Azerbaijan